The League of Mercy was a British foundation established in 1899 by royal charter of Queen Victoria. The goal of the organisation was to recruit a large number of volunteers to aid the sick and suffering at charity hospitals. It was disbanded at the establishment of the National Health Service in 1947, with its royal charter subsequently surrendered.

In its lifetime it collected a total of £850,000, £600,000 for London Hospitals and £250,000 for rural 'cottage hospitals' with subscriptions being as little as a shilling (12p) a year for servants and tradespeople.

In 1999, the League of Mercy Foundation was established to recognise and reward volunteers.

History
In 1898, Sir Everard Hambro chaired a committee established to consider several submitted plans and proposals on devising a badly needed organisation.

On 1 March 1899, the Edward, Prince of Wales chaired a meeting at Marlborough House to establish a fundraising body to support voluntary hospitals and announce subsequent directives. Sixty-five districts were established based on Parliamentary constituency divisions, each with a president (grandee) who coordinated the collection of donations through middle class volunteers. Many notable contemporaries were in attendance at the meeting, including the Duke of Westminster, the Marquess of Lorne, the Marquess of Camden, Earl Carrington, Earl of Clarendon, Earl of Dartmouth, Sir W. Hart Dyke, Sir Whittaker Ellis, Sir Arthur Hayter, Sir Fitzroy D. Maclean, Weetman Pearson and Edmund Boulnois.

The prince stated:

After being active for nearly half a century, the League ceased its work in 1947 on the creation of the National Health Service, its royal charter subsequently surrendered.

Presidents
The presidents of the original League were:
Edward, Prince of Wales
George, Prince of Wales
Edward, Prince of Wales
Prince Henry, Duke of Gloucester

Badge of the Order of Mercy

The original badge of the order, awarded from 1899, was a red enamelled silver or silver gilt cross surmounted by the plumes of the Prince of Wales and with a central roundel bearing the crest of the League.  The reverse is plain, save for the inscription “League of Mercy 1898” on the central roundel. It was awarded for at least five years distinguished and unpaid personal service to the League in support of charity hospitals, or in the relief of suffering, poverty or distress.  A bar for a second award was introduced in 1917. The Order ceased to be awarded after 1946, and the League itself closed in 1947.

In the United Kingdom, the pre-1947 Badge comes after the Service Medal of the Order of St John and before the Voluntary Medical Service Medal in the order precedence.

League of Mercy Foundation

The League of Mercy Foundation was established as a charity on 30 March 1999, exactly 100 years after the founding of the original League. Its role is to recognise and encourage those who undertake voluntary work in the care of people who are sick, vulnerable or homeless. Other than having the same name, there is no formal connection between the original League of Mercy and the foundation.

The foundation re-established the Order of Mercy with a similar medal design, but in silver gilt and without enamel or the Prince of Wales's plumes. The reverse follows the earlier version, but now shows the year “1999”. A special Companion's Badge was also created to reward wider humanitarian work. This has red enamel, similar to the original badge, and is worn around the neck. The restored League established an annual award ceremony in which approximately 50 people are awarded the Order of Mercy, "as a reward for personal services gratuitously rendered in connection with the purposes for which the League was established." The Medal of the Order of the League of Mercy (OLM) and Companion's Badge of the Order of the League of Mercy are  awarded each year at the Mansion House in London with awards appearing in the London Gazette. The Badge of the Order of the League of Mercy is part of the official Order of Wear of the United Kingdom, but this only applies to awards made prior to June 1947 when the League's royal charter was surrendered.

Recipients are predominately chosen from long-serving community volunteers in the UK, but recipients have also included heads of former ruling houses, including Prince David Bagrationi of Georgia, and Prince Carlo, Duke of Castro of Bourbon-Two Sicilies, who have received the higher grade of Companion of the Order of Mercy and, in return, have bestowed dynastic orders upon the League's president.

Professor Alan Roberts, OBE, TD, a former pro-chancellor of Leeds University and cadet-commandant of Yorkshire Army Cadet Force, was appointed a Companion of the Order of Mercy in 2002, having previously received an honorary doctorate from Brunel University, whose pro-chancellor is Lord Lingfield. Professor Roberts also serves as gentleman usher of the Imperial Society of Knights Bachelor, whose Knight Principal is Lord Lingfield.

Other recipients include Thomas Balchin, Lord Lingfield's son, who also serves as secretary to the council of the League of Mercy, and Anthony Bailey, OBE.

Legitimacy

The League of Mercy Foundation claims to be the legitimate successor of the original League, however lacks official approval from the monarch. In the United Kingdom, where legitimacy of any particular order is determined by the monarch – some societies have permission from the monarch to award medals, but these are to be worn on the right side of the chest. No UK citizen may accept and wear an award without the sovereign's permission. Moreover, the government is explicit that permission for foreign awards conferred by private societies or institutions will not be granted.

References

External links 
 Official website of the League of Mercy Foundation

1899 establishments in the United Kingdom
1999 establishments in the United Kingdom
Health charities in the United Kingdom
Organizations established in 1899
Organizations established in 1999
Self-styled orders